Kyšice is name of several locations in the Czech Republic:
 Kyšice (Plzeň-City District), a village in Plzeň-City District, Plzeň Region
 Kyšice (Kladno District), a village in Kladno District, Central Bohemian Region
 Malé Kyšice, a village in Kladno District, Central Bohemian Region